Lewis Collins (1946–2013) was an English actor.

Lewis Collins may also refer to:

 Lewis Collins (RAF officer) (1894–1971), British World War I flying ace
 Lewis Collins (footballer), Welsh footballer
 Lewis Preston Collins II (1896–1952), Lieutenant Governor of Virginia
 Lewis D. Collins (1899–1954), American film director

See also
 Lewis Collens, president of the Illinois Institute of Technology from 1990 to 2007